Keith Appleby Arnold (1 October 1926 – 17 January 2021) was an English Anglican clergyman who served as the inaugural Bishop of Warwick from 1980 to 1990.

He was educated at Winchester College and Trinity College, Cambridge. After World War II service  in the Coldstream Guards he was  ordained in 1952 and began his ecclesiastical career with a curacy at Haltwhistle. From here he was successively Rector of St John's, Edinburgh, Kirkby Lonsdale and Vicar of Hemel Hempstead before he ascended to the episcopate.

Arnold died in January 2021 at the age of 94.

References

1926 births
2021 deaths
Alumni of Trinity College, Cambridge
Bishops of Warwick
People educated at West Downs School
People educated at Winchester College